Scott David Sobkowiak (born October 26, 1977) is a former Major League Baseball pitcher who played one game for the Atlanta Braves in .

Sobkowiak attended the University of Northern Iowa, and in 1997 he played collegiate summer baseball with the Falmouth Commodores of the Cape Cod Baseball League. He was selected by Atlanta in the 7th round of the 1998 MLB Draft.

On October 7, 2001, Sobkowiak made his only major league appearance, against the Florida Marlins, giving up one earned run in one inning pitched.

In , he went 8-7 for the Somerset Patriots of the independent Atlantic League. From -, he played for the Atlantic League's Lancaster Barnstormers and went a combined 9-10.

References

External links

1977 births
Living people
American expatriate baseball players in Taiwan
Baseball players from Illinois
Major League Baseball pitchers
Atlanta Braves players
Eugene Emeralds players
Myrtle Beach Pelicans players
Greenville Braves players
Gulf Coast Braves players
Richmond Braves players
Northern Iowa Panthers baseball players
Somerset Patriots players
Lancaster Barnstormers players
People from Woodstock, Illinois
Rockford RiverHawks players
American people of Polish descent
Falmouth Commodores players
Lewis Flyers baseball coaches